South Horr is a settlement in Kenya's former Rift Valley Province. It is located in Laisamis Constituency, of Marsabit County. The A4 Road from Maralal and Baragoi to Loyangalani passes through the village.

References 

Populated places in Marsabit County